Daphne Charlotte Le Breton (1 August 1932 – 25 March 2000) was a New Zealand international lawn bowler.

Bowls career
Le Breton represented New Zealand at the Commonwealth Games in the fours event at the 1986 Commonwealth Games. She won gold and silver medal at the 1985 Asia Pacific Bowls Championships in Tweed Heads. She was a New Zealand champion, winning the 1984 singles title at the New Zealand National Bowls Championships.

Le Breton died on 25 March 2000, aged 67.

References

1932 births
2000 deaths
New Zealand female bowls players
Bowls players at the 1986 Commonwealth Games